Kuno Lorenz (born September 17, 1932  in Vachdorf, Thüringen) is a German philosopher. He developed a philosophy of dialogue, in connection with the pragmatic theory of action of the Erlangen constructivist school. Lorenz is married to the literary scholar Karin Lorenz-Lindemann.

Career 

After studying mathematics and physics in Tübingen, Hamburg, Bonn and Princeton, Lorenz earned his  Ph.D. in 1961 under Paul Lorenzen in Kiel with a thesis about Arithmetic and Logic as Games. In 1969 he received his habilitation degree in philosophy also under Lorenzen but this time in Erlangen. In 1970 he was offered the chair of philosophy at the University of Hamburg to succeed Carl Friedrich von Weizsäcker. From 1974 till his retirement in 1997 he taught at the University of Saarland in Saarbrücken. Among his former students is Arno Ros.

Dialogue and predication 
Lorenz developed (along with Paul Lorenzen) an approach to arithmetic and logic as dialogue games. In dialogical logic (game semantics), tree calculations (generally, of Gentzen-type calculus) are written upside down, so  that the initial assertion of a proponent stays above and is defended against an opponent as in a game. This is a linguistically more congenial approach to logic, which is more suitable as a model for argumentation than the formal derivation in a calculus or truth tables. Lorenz presented for the first time a simple demonstration of Gentzen's consistency proof on this game-theoretic basis. If one regards logic and mathematics in this way as a game, an intuitionist approach becomes a more plausible option.

Dialogical constructivism 

Not only logic, but the whole of philosophy is given a dialogical treatment by Lorenz. Only in the mirror of a relative Other is it possible to reflect upon oneself. Lorenz developed a dialogical constructivism from the focus on the dialogical principle (Martin Buber) and the process of language games of the later Ludwig Wittgenstein. In addition, the pragmatism of Charles Sanders Peirce and the historicism of Wilhelm Dilthey are complementary juxtaposed.

Publications 

1969 with Jürgen Mittelstraß: Die methodische Philosophie Hugo Dinglers Einleitung zum Nachdruck von: Hugo Dingler Die Ergreifung des Wirklichen Kapitel I-IV. Suhrkamp, Frankfurt (Reihe Theorie 1) S. 7-55
1970 Elemente der Sprachkritik Eine Alternative zum Dogmatismus und Skeptizismus in der Analytischen Philosophie Suhrkamp, Frankfurt (Reihe Theorie)
1977 Einführung zu: Richard Gätschenberger Zeichen, die Fundamente des Wissens Zweite, unveränd. Aufl., vermehrt um eine Einführung von Kuno Lorenz. (Nachdr. v. 1932) frommann-holzboog, Stuttgart (problemata; 59)
1978 with Paul Lorenzen: Dialogische Logik WBG, Darmstadt 
1978 (Hrsg.): Konstruktionen versus Positionen Beiträge zur Diskussion um die konstruktive Wissenschaftstheorie. Paul Lorenzen zum 60. Geburtstag. de Gruyter, Berlin, New York 
1980 Sprachphilosophie in: Althaus u.a. (Hrsg.): Lexikon der germanistischen Linguistik Niemeyer, Tübingen
1982 (Hrsg.): Identität und Individuation (2 Bde.) frommann-holzboog, Stuttgart 
1986 Dialogischer Konstruktivismus In: K. Salamun (Hrsg.): Was ist Philosophie? Mohr, Tübingen
1990 Einführung in die philosophische Anthropologie WBG, Darmstadt ²1992 
 1992/6 with  M. Dascal, D. Gerhardus und G. Meggle) (Hrsg.): Sprachphilosophie Ein internationales Handbuch zeitgenössischer Forschung (2 Halbbde.) Berlin/New York
1998 Indische Denker Beck, München  (Rezension)
2009 Dialogischer Konstruktivismus de Gruyter, Berlin, New York

Further reading 

 Gerhardus, Dietfried und Silke M. Kledzik (Hrsg.): Vom Finden und Erfinden in Kunst, Philosophie, Wissenschaft: k(l)eine Denkpause für Kuno Lorenz zum 50. Geburtstag. Universitätsdruck, Saarbrücken 1985  
 Astroh, Michael (Hrsg.): Dialogisches Handeln: eine Festschrift für Kuno Lorenz. Spektrum, Heidelberg 1997

External links 
 Literature of and about Kuno Lorenz in the catalog of the German National Library (record Kuno Lorenz • PICA-Record)

Philosophers of language
20th-century German philosophers
21st-century German philosophers
Game theorists
German logicians
Modal logicians
Philosophers of mathematics
1932 births
Living people
German male writers